Carex bullata is a tussock-forming species of perennial sedge in the family Cyperaceae. It is native to south eastern parts of Canada and eastern parts of the United States.

See also
List of Carex species

References

bullata
Taxa named by Carl Ludwig Willdenow
Plants described in 1805
Flora of Alabama
Flora of Arkansas
Flora of Connecticut
Flora of Delaware
Flora of Georgia (U.S. state)
Flora of Maine
Flora of Maryland
Flora of Massachusetts
Flora of New Jersey
Flora of New York (state)
Flora of North Carolina
Flora of Nova Scotia
Flora of Rhode Island
Flora of Tennessee
Flora of Virginia